Kanian may refer to:

 Kanian, Salmas, a village in Iran
 Martik Kanian, Iranian singer and songwriter

See also 
 
 Khanian (disambiguation)
 Kaniyan